The Rose of Granada (Italian:La rosa di Granata) is a 1916 Italian silent film directed by Emilio Ghione and starring Ida Carloni Talli, Lina Cavalieri and Diomira Jacobini.

This film may have been rereleased in 1919 as The House of Granada by Paramount.

Cast
 Ida Carloni Talli 
 Lina Cavalieri 
 Diomira Jacobini 
 Ignazio Lupi
 Lucien Muratore 
 Claudio Nicola 
 Kally Sambucini

References

Bibliography
 Paul Fryer, Olga Usova. Lina Cavalieri: The Life of Opera's Greatest Beauty, 1874-1944. McFarland, 2003.

External links
 

1916 films
1910s Italian-language films
Italian silent feature films
Films directed by Emilio Ghione
Italian black-and-white films